Buri may refer to:

People
 Buri (Dacian tribe), a 1st–2nd century tribe living in Dacia
 Buri tribe, an ancient Germanic people
 Büri (died 1252), prince of the Chagatai Khanate
 Buri, or Burebista, Thracian king of the Getae and Dacian from 82/61 BC–45/44 BC
 Taj al-Muluk Buri (died 1132), Prince of Damascus and namesake of its Buri dynasty
 Antti Buri (born 1988), Finnish racing driver

Places

 Buri, Bahrain
 Buri, São Paulo, Brazil
 Buri Peninsula, Eritrea
 Buri, Iran
 Burí, Jirondai, Panama, a corregimiento in Jirondai District, Ngäbe-Buglé Comarca, Republic of Panama
 Büri, Panama, a corregimiento in Kankintú District, Ngäbe-Buglé Comarca, Republic of Panama
 The name of several Thai mueangs (city-states)

Other uses
 Búri, a Norse god
 Búri (cave), a lava tube in Iceland
 A Latin name of the Burs, an ancient Dacian Kingdom
 Buri palm, a name for trees of the genus Corypha
 Buri, traditional Philippine tattoos
 A Japanese word for Japanese amberjack, a species of fish also known as hamachi prized for sushi and sashimi

See also
 Bury (disambiguation)